John van den Akker (born 30 May 1966, in Veldhoven) is a Dutch former cyclist, who was professional from 1988 to 1997.

Career achievements

Major results

1986
 1st Ronde van Midden-Nederland
1987
 1st Stage 3 Olympia's Tour
1988
 7th Brussels–Ingooigem
1989
 3rd Scheldeprijs
 5th Grand Prix de la Libération (TTT)
 7th Circuit des Frontières
1990
 1st Stage 5 Vuelta a Murcia
 1st Stage 5 Étoile de Bessèges
 3rd Paris–Camembert
 10th Overall Tour of Sweden
1991
 3rd GP Rik Van Steenbergen
1992
 2nd Overall Tour de Luxembourg
 7th Grand Prix d'Isbergues
 9th Overall Étoile de Bessèges
1994
 9th Grand Prix d'Isbergues
1995
 8th Binche–Tournai–Binche
1997
 2nd Overall Olympia's Tour
1st Stage 4
 9th Overall Tour of Sweden
1998
 1st Stage 6 Olympia's Tour
 4th Hel van het Mergelland

Grand Tour general classification results timeline

References

External links

1966 births
Living people
Dutch male cyclists
People from Veldhoven
Cyclists from North Brabant